Paxton Airport is a public use airport located 2 miles southwest of Paxton, Illinois, United States. The airport is publicly owned by the City of Paxton.

The airport has one runway, 18/36, which is 3,409 x 50 ft (1,039 x 15 m) and is paved with asphalt. There is a city-owned fixed-base operator on the airport offering fuel.

For the 12-month period ending August 31, 2019, the airport had 77 aircraft operations per week, or about 3,000 per year. This includes 95% general aviation and 5% air taxi. For the same time period, there were 17 aircraft based on the field: 11 single-engine airplanes and six ultralights.

The airport is a significant hub for agricultural aviation and most of its traffic is from air tractors. Along with nearby Tuscola Airport, Paxton has seen significant improvements, such as funding for the paving of its runway, in support of the aerial application business since 2020.

References 

Airports in Illinois